The Mediterranee Lock is a single chamber lock on the Canal du Midi. It was built around 1670, and it is 46.6km from Toulouse. The adjacent locks are the Roc Lock to the east and the Océan Lock to the west. The Mediterranee Lock marks the start of the descending section of the canal going east to west towards the Mediterranean Sea.

It is located in the town of Mas-Saintes-Puelles in the Aude department in the Occitanie region .

History 
It was originally called l'écluse du Médecin.

See also 
 Locks on the Canal du Midi

Notes and references 

Locks on the Canal du Midi
Aude